Alex de Campi is a British-born American music video director, comics writer and columnist.

Career

Comics
Alex de Campi wrote 2005's mini-series Smoke (published by IDW Publishing, art by Igor Kordey), which was nominated for the Eisner Award for Best Limited Series, and her 2006 manga series Kat & Mouse (published by Tokyopop, art by Federica Manfredi). Some of De Campi's work falls outside the superhero genre, with Smoke being a political thriller, and Kat & Mouse detailing the adventures of two mystery-solving high school students (a "CSI for tweens"); she has published work for children (e.g. Agent Boo) and for the European market (e.g. her French language sci-noir series Messiah Complex).

Her other works includes the Valentine mobile comic, which was the main focus of her column "Uncanny Valleygirl" at the comics industry website Bleeding Cool. and Grindhouse comics for Dark Horse.

In April 2015, she launched an ongoing thriller at Image Comics titled No Mercy with Carla Speed McNeil. In addition, she wrote a mini-crossover series for Archie Comics and Dark Horse Comics titled "Archie vs. Predator" in which the Archie gang meets The Predator. The series was the last in which Archie the gang were illustrated in the classic style. In 2019, a sequel was released by De Campi "Archie vs. Predator II" in which the rebooted versions of the Archie characters meet the rebooted Predator from the latest film. In v2015 she also wrote a two-issue Wonder Woman story, among other comics.

In 2017, she co-authored with Arthur Wyatt a Judge Dredd story that takes place in the cinematic universe of the 2012 film Dredd, published in issues 386-388 of Judge Dredd Megazine.

In November 2018 it was announced by the streaming service Crunchyroll that it would produce an anime science fiction series based in the world Blade Runner called Blade Runner: Black Lotus which is scheduled to be released in 2021. De Campi wrote two episodes for the series.

In 2019 de Campi released a graphic novella called Bad Girls with artist Victor Santos recounting a robbery that takes place in the face of the revolution in Cuba. The book was highly acclaimed and won de Campi two nominations for the Eisner Award. She received two more nominations for the Eisner's in 2019 for the anthology series "Twisted Romance" she published around Valentine's Day for Image Comics.

In 2020, de Campi co-created with Duncan Jones a crowd-funded comic titled MADI: Once Upon a Time in the Future that takes place in the cinematic universe of his previous films "Moon" and "Mute"

The British Science Fiction Association's journal Vector praised DeCampi's work Grindhouse as one of six groundbreaking science fiction works in the comics medium, and declared: "If science fiction was ever a male genre, and comics ever a male medium, de Campi is the saboteur extraordinaire."

Films
De Campi is a filmmaker, directing a number of music videos, including the video for Amanda Palmer's "Leeds United", the animated video for Flipron's "Raindrops Keep Falling on the Dead" (which was featured at the 2008 Marfa Film Festival, and SXSW in 2007), The Real Tuesday Weld feat The Puppini Sisters' "Apart of Me" (shown at Soho Shorts in 2008) and for The Schema's "Those Rules You Made". She has given a "BBC Two Masterclass" on shooting videos, for Blast (a BBC initiative to encourage creativity in young people), focusing on her October 2007 video for The Real Tuesday Weld versus The Puppini Sisters.

Prose Novels 
In 2020 de Campi published her first full-length book The Scottish Boy. Chapters from the book had been published online since 2018.

Her second prose novel, Heartbreak Incorporated was released in the summer of 2021.

Works

Bibliography 
 Smoke (art by Igor Kordey, 3-issue mini-series, 2005, tpb, 156 pages, December 2005)
 Kat & Mouse (art by Federica Manfredi, 2006)
 Agent Boo (art by Edo Fuijkschot, 2006)
 Messiah Complex (art by [duardo Ocana, 2006)
 Adam in Chromaland (art by Luigi Giammarino, 2007)
 Archie vs. Predator (art by Fernando Ruiz, 4-issue mini-series, 2015)
 "Desiderium" (short story), Whose Future is It?, chapter 13 (2018)
 Archie vs. Predator II (art by Robert Hack, 5-issue mini-series, 2019)
 Bad Karma (Panel Syndicate) (art by Ryan Howe and Dee Cunniffe, 2020)

Videography 
 "Leeds United" - Amanda Palmer (Roadrunner) Aug 2008
 "Last Words" - The Real Tuesday Weld (Six Degrees) Oct 2008
 "Guilty Pleasure" - Manda Rin (ThisisfakeDIY) Oct 2008
 "Lighthouse" - The Duloks (unsigned) - Aug 2008
 "Book of Lies" - Flipron (Tiny Dog) Jul 2008
 "These Eyes" - Martin/Towers (Northstar Records) Feb 2008
 "Jilted" - The Puppini Sisters (Universal) Jan 2008
 "(I Can't Believe I'm Not A) Millionaire" A-side and B-side versions - The Puppini Sisters (Universal) Jan 2008
 "Pretty Little Miss Dysmorphia" - Des O'Connor (unsigned) Jan 2008
 "Apart of Me" - The Real Tuesday Weld feat The Puppini Sisters (Six Degrees) Oct 2007
 "Those Rules" - The Schema (unsigned) Aug 2007
 "Why Dogs Howl at the Moon" - Thomas Truax (ST Records) Jul 2007
 "Dogboy vs Monsters" - Flipron (Tiny Dog) Mar 2007
 "Raindrops Keep Falling on the Dead" - Flipron (Tiny Dog) May 2006

Notes

References

External links 

 

 

British writers in French
American music video directors
Living people
Year of birth missing (living people)
British music video directors
American comics writers
British comics writers
DC Comics people
21st-century British writers
21st-century American writers
Place of birth missing (living people)